Martin William Cearns  (born April 1945)  is a former chairman of English football club West Ham United.

A bank manager with Barclays Bank, Cearns became a board member with West Ham taking over the chairmanship in 1990 from his father, Len Cearns. He held the position until 1992 when it was taken over by Terry Brown.  Although no longer chairman, Cearns remained on the board until 1 December 2006 when he resigned when the club was sold to Icelandic billionaire, Björgólfur Guðmundsson for £85m. As part of the takeover he made £7.76m from the sale of his 1,844,000 shares in West Ham.
Cearns' time at West Ham is remembered for his advocacy, with Peter Storrie, of the Hammers Bond scheme, a financial bond which West Ham fans would have been forced to buy before being allowed to purchase a season ticket. The proposal led to demonstrations both inside and outside West Ham's ground and to pitch invasions.

References

1945 births
English businesspeople
West Ham United F.C. directors and chairmen
English football chairmen and investors
Living people
Date of birth missing (living people)